Moncreiffe House is a country house near Bridge of Earn in Perthshire in Scotland. It is a category B listed building.

History

The original house was designed by Sir William Bruce in the classical style for Sir Thomas Moncreiffe, 1st Baronet and was completed in 1679.

It was the headquarters of the Polish I Corps, which was formed under Scottish Command in September 1940, during the Second World War.

After the original house was completely destroyed by fire 1957, claiming the life of Sir David Moncreiffe of that Ilk, 10th Baronet and 23rd Laird, it was rebuilt to a design by Sir William Kininmonth in 1962. The old doorpiece from the original house was used in the construction of the new building.

Part of the driveway leading to the house was built over in the 1980s during the construction of the M90 motorway.

An ancient stone circle stands in the grounds of the house.

References

Country houses in Perth and Kinross
Listed houses in Scotland
Category B listed buildings in Perth and Kinross